Mika Laurikainen (born 28 April 1963) is a Finnish football manager who works as a director of sports for Finnish Veikkausliiga club TPS.

References

1963 births
Living people
Finnish footballers
Finnish football managers
FF Jaro managers
TPS Turku football managers
Association footballers not categorized by position
Footballers from Turku